Captain Hook is the villain of J. M. Barrie's Peter Pan stories.

Captain Hook may also refer to:

People

People with the surname
 Captain Hereward Hook, a British captain who, as a 15-year-old sailor, survived the 22 September 1914 U-boat attack that sank HMS Hogue

People with the nickname
 Sparky Anderson, former baseball manager
 Roy Jones Jr., American boxer
 Mike Sigel, American professional pool player
 Zavier Simpson, American basketball player

Music
 "Captain Hook" (Ch!pz song), a song by Ch!pz from their album The Adventures of Ch!pz
 "Captain Hook", a song by John Cale from his album Sabotage/Live
"Captain Hook" (Megan Thee Stallion song), a song by Megan Thee Stallion from her EP Suga

Other uses
Captain Hook (Once Upon a Time) (also known as Killian Jones), a character from the ABC television series Once Upon a Time
Captain Hook's Pirate Adventures, a locally produced pirate-themed Christian children's TV show that aired on WHMB-TV in Indianapolis, Indiana from 1972 until 1993